The discography of Austrian producer and rapper Chakuza.

Studio albums

Mixtapes

Extended plays

Compilations

Singles

As lead artist

Collaboration singles

As featured performer

Free tracks

References

External links
Beatlefield.com

Discographies of Austrian artists